In mathematics, the Koszul complex was first introduced to define a cohomology theory for Lie algebras, by Jean-Louis Koszul (see Lie algebra cohomology). It turned out to be a useful general construction in homological algebra. As a tool, its homology can be used to tell when a set of elements of a (local) ring is an M-regular sequence, and hence it can be used to prove basic facts about the depth of a module or ideal which is an algebraic notion of dimension that is related to but different from the geometric notion of Krull dimension. Moreover, in certain circumstances, the complex is the complex of syzygies, that is, it tells you the relations between generators of a module, the relations between these relations, and so forth.

Definition 
Let R be a commutative ring and E a free module of finite rank r over R. We write  for the i-th exterior power of E. Then, given an R-linear map ,
the Koszul complex associated to s is the chain complex of R-modules:
,
where the differential  is given by: for any  in E,
.
The superscript  means the term is omitted. To show that , use the self-duality of a Koszul complex.

Note also that ; this isomorphism is not canonical (for example, a choice of a volume form in differential geometry provides an example of such an isomorphism.)

If  (i.e., an ordered basis is chosen), then, giving an R-linear map  amounts to giving a finite sequence  of elements in R (namely, a row vector) and then one sets 

If M is a finitely generated R-module, then one sets:
,
which is again a chain complex with the induced differential . 

The i-th homology of the Koszul complex

is called the i-th Koszul homology.

and so

Similarly,

Koszul complexes in low dimensions
Given a commutative ring R, an element x in R, and an R-module M, the multiplication by x yields a homomorphism of R-modules,

By construction, the homologies are

the annihilator of x in M.
Thus, the Koszul complex and its homology encode fundamental properties of the multiplication by x. This chain complex  is called the Koszul complex of R with respect to x, as in #Definition.

The Koszul complex for a pair  is 

with the matrices  and  given by

 and

Note that  is applied on the left. The cycles in degree 1 are then exactly the linear relations on the elements x and y, while the boundaries are the trivial relations. The first Koszul homology H1(K•(x, y)) therefore measures exactly the relations mod the trivial relations. With more elements the higher-dimensional Koszul homologies measure the higher-level versions of this.

In the case that the elements  form a regular sequence, the higher homology modules of the Koszul complex are all zero.

Example

Properties of a Koszul homology 

Using ,
there is the exact sequence of complexes:

Taking the long exact sequence of homologies, we obtain:

Here, the connecting homomorphism

is computed as follows. By definition,  where y is an element of  that maps to x. Since  is a direct sum, we can simply take y to be (0, x). Then the early formula for  gives .

The above exact sequence can be used to prove the following.

Proof by induction on r. If , then . Next, assume the assertion is true for r - 1. Then, using the above exact sequence, one sees  for any .

Proof: By the theorem applied to S and S as an S-module, we see K(y1, ..., yn) is an S-free resolution of S/(y1, ..., yn). On the other hand,  by the definition of the S-module structure on M. 

Proof: Let S = R[y1, ..., yn]. Turn M into an S-module through the ring homomorphism S → R, yi → xi and R an S-module through . By the preceding corollary,  and then
 

For a local ring, the converse of the theorem holds. More generally,

Proof: We only need to show 2. implies 1., the rest being clear. We argue by induction on r. The case r = 1 is already known. Let x denote x1, ..., xr-1. Consider

By Nakayama's lemma,  and so x is a regular sequence by the inductive hypothesis. Since the second  is injective (i.e., is a nonzerodivisor),  is a regular sequence. (Note: by Nakayama's lemma, the requirement  is automatic.)

Tensor products of Koszul complexes 
In general, if C, D are chain complexes, then their tensor product  is the chain complex given by

with the differential: for any homogeneous elements x, y,

where |x| is the degree of x.

This construction applies in particular to Koszul complexes. Let E, F be finite-rank free modules, and let  and  be two R-linear maps. Let  be the Koszul complex of the linear map . Then, as complexes,

To see this, it is more convenient to work with an exterior algebra (as opposed to exterior powers). Define the graded derivation of degree 

by requiring: for any homogeneous elements x, y in ΛE,
 when 

Now, we have  as graded R-modules. Also, by the definition of a tensor product mentioned in the beginning,

Note, in particular,
.

The next proposition shows how the Koszul complex of elements encodes some information about sequences in the ideal generated by them.

Proof: (Easy but omitted for now)

As an application, we can show the depth-sensitivity of a Koszul homology.

The Koszul homology gives a very useful characterization of a depth.

Proof: To lighten the notations, we write H(-) for H(K(-)). The basic case  is clear from #Properties of a Koszul homology. From the long exact sequence of Koszul homologies and the inductive hypothesis,
,
which is
This completes the proof of the claim.

Now, it follows from the claim and the early proposition that  for all i > n - s. To conclude n - s = m, it remains to show that it is nonzero if i = n - s. Thus, by prime avoidance, there is some nonzero v in  such that , which is to say,

Self-duality 
There is an approach to a Koszul complex that uses a cochain complex instead of a chain complex. As it turns out, this results essentially in the same complex (the fact known as the self-duality of a Koszul complex).

Let E be a free module of finite rank r over a ring R. Then each element e of E gives rise to the exterior left-multiplication by e:

Since , we have: ; that is,

is a cochain complex of free modules. Taking the dual, there is the complex:
.
Using an isomorphism , the complex  coincides with the Koszul complex in the definition.

Use

The Koszul complex is essential in defining the joint spectrum of a tuple of commuting bounded linear operators in a Banach space.

See also
Koszul–Tate complex
Syzygy (mathematics)

Notes

References
 David Eisenbud, Commutative Algebra. With a view toward algebraic geometry, Graduate Texts in Mathematics, vol 150, Springer-Verlag, New York, 1995.

External links
 Melvin Hochster, Math 711: Lecture of October 3, 2007 (especially the very last part).

Homological algebra